The D50 class is an old class of 2-8-0 steam locomotives built for the New South Wales Government Railways of Australia.

History

The first was delivered in May 1896 by Beyer, Peacock and Company with further orders over the next 20 years seeing the class number 280. Their second and third coupled wheel tyres were flangeless to reduce curve friction.

During the First World War, an additional 10 locomotives of this class were under construction at the North British Locomotive Company, but these types of engines were not delivered to Australia, being taken over by the British War Office for the Royal Engineers Railway Operating Division. After the war, they were offered back to the New South Wales Government Railways at higher than new prices and in a badly worn condition. The 2 other locomotives were acquired by S.A. Force, Eclairage et Docks de Gand in Ghent, Belgium.

The Commonwealth Railways also chose this design to be its first goods locomotive class, building eight K-class engines, for the Trans-Australian Railway.

The last 75 engines were built with superheaters and after being judged a success many of the class were retrofitted. Many engines of the class received turret type tenders in later years which provided better visibility when operating in reverse.

In the 1930s, 72 engines were withdrawn and after being used during the load testing of the Sydney Harbour Bridge in 1932 with most of these locomotives being later scrapped, although 14 engines were rebuilt with superheaters and returned to service. By mid-1964 there were only 113 engines left in service with the class of these kinds of engines by now normally restricted to working coal trains in the Hunter Valley and shunting duties in the larger marshalling yards throughout the system.  Several of these heavy shunters were fitted with automatic couplings on the front buffer beam from 1960 onwards.

5069 and 5132 are both preserved by Dorrigo Steam Railway and Museum at Dorrigo. 5069 and 5132 were 2 engines of the 88 locomotives used to test the Sydney Harbour Bridge before it opened.  5069 is still in its original saturated condition whilst 5132 is the only superheated 50 class engine preserved and is also fitted with the only preserved Morts Dock tender.  5096 is also a saturated version and is currently stored at Broadmeadow. 5112, also in saturated condition, was cosmetically restored at the Lithgow State Mine Heritage Park & Railway between 2005 and 2010 before being placed on static display at Bathurst; this locomotive is known as the "Chifley Engine" as it was regularly driven by future Prime Minister of Australia Ben Chifley before he entered politics. Four engines are preserved.

Preservation

Gallery

See also
 NSWGR steam locomotive classification

References

 

50
2-8-0 locomotives
Beyer, Peacock locomotives
Dübs locomotives
Neilson locomotives
NBL locomotives
Clyde Engineering locomotives
Railway locomotives introduced in 1896
Railway Operating Division locomotives
Standard gauge locomotives of Australia
Freight locomotives